Salomea is a neighbourhood, and an area of the Municipal Information System, in the city of Warsaw, Poland, located within the district of Włochy.

History 
In the 19th century, from the village of Opacz Wielka had been separated its north-west portion, forming the village of Salomea. It was named after Salomea Kalinowska (1772–1852), wife of Kajetan Dominik Kalinowski, owner of both villages.

Between 1883 and 1890, the Fort V "Włochy" had been build between Salomea and Załuski, as part of the series of fortifications of the Warsaw Fortress, build around Warsaw by the Russian Empire. In 1909, it was decided to decommission and demolish the fortifications of the Warsaw Fortress, due to the high costs of their maintenance, and as such the Fort V had been partially demolished in 1913.

In 1927, the Electric Commuter Railway had build the train connection line, which connected Salomea to the nearby city of Warsaw.

On 5 May 1951, Salomea had been incorporated into the city of Warsaw.

Citations

Notes

References 

Neighbourhoods of Włochy
Populated places established in the 19th century